Oei Hok Tiang (born 15 August 1932) is an Indonesian boxer. He competed in the men's bantamweight event at the 1960 Summer Olympics.

References

External links
 

1932 births
Living people
Indonesian male boxers
Olympic boxers of Indonesia
Boxers at the 1960 Summer Olympics
Place of birth missing (living people)
Bantamweight boxers
20th-century Indonesian people